German submarine U-876 was a long-range Type IXD2 U-boat built for Nazi Germany's Kriegsmarine during World War II.

She was ordered on 25 August 1941, and was laid down on 5 June 1943 at DeSchiMAG AG Weser, Bremen, as yard number 1084. She was launched on 29 February 1944 and commissioned under the command of Kapitänleutnant Rolf Bahn on 24 May 1944.

Design
German Type IXD2 submarines were considerably larger than the original Type IXs. U-876 had a displacement of  when at the surface and  while submerged. She had two shafts and two  propellers.

U-876 was fitted with six  torpedo tubes (four fitted at the bow and two at the stern), 24 torpedoes, one  SK C/32 naval gun, 150 rounds, and a  Flak M42 with 2575 rounds as well as two  C/30 anti-aircraft guns with 8100 rounds. The boat had a complement of fifty-five.

Service history
On 9 April 1945, U-876 was damaged by bombs in a British air raid.

U-876 was scuttled at Eckernförde on 3 May 1945, as part of Operation Regenbogen. Her wreck was raised and broken up in 1947.

References

Bibliography

External links

World War II submarines of Germany
German Type IX submarines
Ships built in Bremen (state)
1944 ships
U-boats commissioned in 1944
Operation Regenbogen (U-boat)
Maritime incidents in May 1945